This is a list of globular clusters. The apparent
magnitude does not include an extinction correction.

Milky Way
These are globular clusters within the halo of the Milky Way galaxy. The diameter is in minutes of arc as seen from Earth. For reference, the J2000 epoch celestial coordinates of the Galactic Center are right ascension , declination . A high proportion of globular clusters are located in the Ophiuchus and Sagittarius constellations, both of which lie in the direction of the galactic core.

Local Group

See also
 Lists of astronomical objects

References

 
 Galactic Globular Clusters Database, from Marco Castellani (Astronomical Observatory of Rome, Italy)
 VizieR VII/202 – Globular Clusters in the Milky Way (Harris, 1997)
 An Atlas of the Universe, Richard Powell
 ARVAL Catalog of Bright Globular Clusters, Andrés Valencia and Arnaldo Arnal
 Djorgovski, S., and Meylan, G. 1993, in "Structure and Dynamics of Globular Clusters", ASP Conf. Ser. vol. 50, p. 325

External links
 LMC Clusters database, University of Cambridge.
 
 Catalog of Variable Stars in Galactic Globular Clusters, Christine Clement, University of Toronto.

Globular clusters
List
Globular